The Word Works is a literary organization based in Washington, DC. The press was founded in 1974 and has published works by Frannie Lindsay, Fred Marchant, Jay Rogoff, Grace Cavalieri, Donna Denizé, Christopher Bursk, and Enid Shomer
and is a member of the Council of Literary Magazines and Presses. The Word Works features contemporary poetry and literature, often written by emerging poets. The Word Works titles have been reviewed by Publishers Weekly, The Rumpus, The Common, Lambda Literary, and other venues; and distributed by Small Press Distribution, Ingram Content Group, Baker & Taylor.

A non-profit organization completely run by volunteers, Word Works was originally funded through frequent grants received from the National Endowment for the Arts.  These grants were supplemented through private donations and revenue from book sales.  Word Works has also received grants from the DC Commission on the Arts and Humanities, the Witter Bynner Foundation, the Maryland Council on the Arts, the Virginia Commission on the Arts, the Batir Foundation, and Hechingers.

Since 1981, the press has overseen a yearly literary competition awarding the $1,500 Washington Prize for a winning poetry manuscript. The organization has also hosted the longest running literary series in the Washington area through their Joaquin Miller Cabin series at the Joaquin Miller Cabin in Rock Creek Park. The Word Works has several book imprints, including the Washington Prize, the Hilary Tham Capital Collection, and International Editions.

From 1996 to 2003, the organization held arts retreats in Tuscany, Italy.

The organization's archives are housed at the Special Collections Research Center in the Estelle and Melvin Gelman Library at The George Washington University.

References

External links
The Best Free Literary Contests  |  Insights from Editors and Judges  |  Nancy White, Administrator of the Word Works Washington Prize
Word Works Press Website
Metamorphosis Literary Agency
Directory Listing: Poets & Writers > Small Presses > The Word Works
Preliminary Guide to the Word Works, Inc. Records, 1971-2013, Special Collections Research Center, Estelle and Melvin Gelman Library, The George Washington University

Book publishing companies of the United States
Culture of Washington, D.C.
Non-profit organizations based in Washington, D.C.
Publishing companies established in 1974
1974 establishments in Washington, D.C.